The 1987–88 Fulham RLFC season was the eighth in the club's history. They competed in the 1987–88 Second Division of the Rugby Football League. They also competed in the 1987–88 Challenge Cup, 1987–88 Lancashire Cup and the 1987–88 League Cup. They finished the season in 17th place in the second tier of British professional rugby league.

1987-88 Second Division league table

Second Division

1987-88 squad

References

External links
Rugby League Project

London Broncos seasons
London Broncos season
1987 in rugby league by club
1987 in English rugby league
London Broncos season
1988 in rugby league by club
1988 in English rugby league